Eastham bridge was a Grade II listed bridge over the River Teme at Eastham, near Tenbury Wells, Worcestershire, England. Built as a toll bridge in 1793, tolls ceased to be charged in 1907, when the bridge was purchased by Worcestershire County Council.

The listed bridge collapsed in 2016 and a replacement opened in April 2017.

The small village of Eastham is situated just on the south bank of the Teme, and the bridge connected that village and other settlements in its parish with the north bank, where the A443 and A456 main roads pass. The north bank is the civil parish of Lindridge.

Listed bridge
The bridge was granted Grade II heritage status in October 1952, prohibiting unauthorised modifications. The list entry describes it as:

Collapse
On 24 May 2016, part of the bridge collapsed into the river. The county council at first said that the bridge would be repaired and that this would take a year or more; in the meantime, motorists, cyclists, pedestrians, and horse-riders who wish to cross the river must undertake a ten-mile diversion. It was decided to demolish the remains of the bridge and build a new rather than repair, due to costs and length of time that would be involved to undertake the required heritage repair.

New bridge
Following demolition of the remains of the listed bridge in the winter of 2016/7, Worcestershire County Council are as of February 2017 constructing a single-traffic bridge of steel construction to permanently replace the old bridge. It is due to open to traffic in the spring of 2017.

References

External links

Bridges in Worcestershire
Bridges completed in 1793
Grade II listed bridges
Former toll bridges in England
2016 in England
2016 disasters in the United Kingdom